The Seafarer 31 Mark I is an American sailboat that was designed by William H. Tripp Jr., with design development by McCurdy & Rhodes, as a racer-cruiser and first built in 1968.

The design was originally marketed by the manufacturer as the Seafarer 31, but is now usually referred to as the Seafarer 31 Mark I to differentiate it from the unrelated McCurdy and Rhodes-designed 1974 Seafarer 31 Mark II.

Production
The design was built by Seafarer Yachts in the United States, starting in 1968, but it is now out of production. Boats were offered complete or in kit form under the name Seacraft Kits for amatur-completion.

Design
The Seafarer 31 Mark I is a recreational keelboat, built predominantly of fiberglass with a solid hull and balsa-cored deck, with wood trim. It has a masthead sloop rig wkith an optional tall mast or an optional yawl rig. The hull has a spooned, raked stem; a raised counter, angled transom, a skeg-mounted rudder controlled by a tiller and a fixed fin keel. The sloop model displaces  and carries  of lead ballast, while the yawl model displaces  and carries  of lead ballast.

The boat is fitted with a Universal Atomic 4  gasoline engine for docking and maneuvering.

The design has sleeping accommodation for four people, with a double "V"-berth in the bow cabin and two straight settee berths in the main cabin. The galley is located on the starboard side just aft of the bow cabin. The galley is equipped with a two-burner stove, an ice box and a double sink. The head is located just aft of the bow cabin on the port side.

See also
List of sailing boat types

References

Keelboats
1960s sailboat type designs
Sailing yachts
Sailboat type designs by William H. Tripp Jr.
Sailboat type designs by McCurdy & Rhodes
Sailboat types built by Seafarer Yachts